Gilbert Balfour (died 1576) was a 16th-century Scottish courtier and mercenary captain. He probably played a leading role in the murder of Lord Darnley, consort of Mary, Queen of Scots.

Family background, marriage, and Orkney lands

He was the second son of Andrew Balfour of Mountquhanie in Kilmany, Fife, and Janet Bruce. Balfour married Margaret Bothwell, the half-sister sister of Adam Bothwell, Bishop of Orkney, who endowed him with the isle of Westray and lands at Birsay including Marwick, Birsay Besouth, and Skalden Fea, from episcopal property. Balfour and Bothwell quarrelled over the lands at Birsay.

Gilbert Balfour was appointed Constable of the Bishop of Orkney, Adam Bothwell. He was the administrator for the collection of rents in the bishopric, which included "fat goods" of butter and oil from Shetland. The produce was shipped to Leith and sold to merchants. He was made sheriff of Orkney in 1566.

At Noltland on Westray, Balfour built one of the most impressive castles in the Orkney Islands, and indeed the Northern Isles. It is situated above the Bay of Pierowall, was built in the 1560s. It is notable for an unusually large spiral staircase, "second only to Fyvie Castle, while its triple tiers of gunloops are without parallel in Scotland, if not Europe".

Master of Household
On 1 October 1565 Mary, Queen of Scots, appointed him her Master of Household, a leading servant responsible for wages and the provision of food.

Balfour had a prominent role at the baptism of Prince James at Stirling Castle in December 1566. There was a procession bringing the food into the Great Hall, which he joined as a Master of Household walking with the Laird of Findlater and Francisco de Busso. During the entertainment, written by George Buchanan, Latin verses were sung by nymphs and satyrs in honour of the food and hosts, and characters represented the Orkney Islands.

In January 1573, Gilbert Balfour and his brothers, James Balfour of Pittendreich and Robert Balfour, were pardoned for treason and other crimes by Regent Morton and given a caution or bail of 10,000 merks to continue in good behaviour. Morton required Balfour and his wife to surrender Westray Castle and his lands at Noltland to Robert Stewart, 1st Earl of Orkney, who was feuar of Orkney and Zetland, and his wife Jean Kennedy.

Before he could ever use the castle, Balfour was executed in Stockholm for participating in the Mornay Plot against King John III of Sweden. Ownership of Noltland passed to Archibald Balfour of Westray and on to Andrew Balfour of Montquhanie.

References

16th-century Scottish people
People from Orkney
Scottish mercenaries
1576 deaths
Masters of the Scottish royal household